Osney Lock Hydro is a micro hydroelectric scheme in Oxford, England. It is located on the River Thames, using the head of water provided by the weir at Osney Lock. It can generate  of electricity with its archimedes screw turbine. Between 2015 and 2020 the scheme generated an average of  a year of electricity, which is enough to power around 60 homes.

The scheme is owned and operated by Osney Lock Hydro, an industrial and provident society for the benefit of the community. The idea for the project was first raised in 2002, with construction work starting in the summer of 2013, and the first electricity was generated in May 2015.

References

External links 
Osney Lock Hydro web site

Buildings and structures in Oxford
Hydroelectric power stations in England
Organisations based in Oxford
Power stations in South East England